Back at Your Ass for the Nine-4 is the sixth studio album by Miami-based hip hop group 2 Live Crew. It was released on February 1, 1994 via Luke Records and was produced by Mike Fresh, DJ Slice, Professor Griff, DJ Spin Felix Sama & DJ Laz. The album became a moderate hit, peaking at #52 on the Billboard 200 and #9 on the Top R&B/Hip-Hop Albums. Two charting singles were produced, "Hell, Yeah" and "You Go Girl" who were both made into music videos. For this album the group was billed as the new 2 Live Crew as Brother Marquis and Mr. Mixx had left the group, the line-up for this album was Fresh Kid Ice, Luke and new member, Verb. It is the last 2 Live Crew album to feature Luke.

Track listing

Personnel

Luther Campbell - performer, executive producer 
Christopher Wong Won - performer 
Larry Dobson - performer 
Gustavo Afont - bass guitar (tracks: 7, 10) 
Richard Griffin - programming (tracks: 2, 12, 23) 
Michael "Mike Fresh" McCray - programming (tracks: 4, 15) 
Anthony Walker - programming (tracks: 6, 7, 9, 13, 17, 21) 
Felix Sama - programming (tracks: 19, 24) 
Darren "DJ Spin" Rudnick - programming (track 19), remixing (tracks: 25, 26) 
Lazaro Mendez - programming (track 24) 
Eddie Miller - mixing 
Ted Stein - mixing 
Tommy Afont - mixing 
Anthony Mizell - design 
Ron Alston - photography 
Rudy Ray Moore - voice (tracks: 1, 3, 5, 14, 18, 21, 22) 
Louis "Don Ugly" Howard - additional vocals (track 2) 
Likkle Wicked - additional vocals (track 2) 
Live - additional vocals (track 7) 
Phat-Daddy - additional vocals (track 9)

Charts

Weekly charts

Year-end charts

References

External links

1994 albums
2 Live Crew albums